Nicolai Calancea (also known as Nicolae Calancea; born 29 August 1986) is a Moldovan professional footballer who plays as a goalkeeper for Sfântul Gheorghe.

Personal life
Calancea's older brother, Valeriu, is a winner of World and European weightlifting medals for Romania.

Honours
Zimbru Chișinău
Cupa Moldovei: 2006–07
Universitatea Craiova
Cupa României: 2017–18

References

External links 
 
 
 
 

1986 births
Living people
Footballers from Chișinău
Moldovan footballers
Association football goalkeepers
Moldovan Super Liga players
FC Zimbru Chișinău players
Russian Premier League players
PFC Krylia Sovetov Samara players
Liga I players
Liga II players
CSM Ceahlăul Piatra Neamț players
FC Voluntari players
CS Universitatea Craiova players
FC Dunărea Călărași players
LPS HD Clinceni players
FC Sfîntul Gheorghe players
Moldova international footballers
Moldovan expatriate footballers
Expatriate footballers in Russia
Moldovan expatriate sportspeople in Russia
Expatriate footballers in Romania
Moldovan expatriate sportspeople in Romania